Steven Woloshen (born 1960) is a Canadian film animator and a pioneer of drawn-on-film animation.

Biography
Born in Montreal, Quebec, Woloshen first attended Vanier College, where he worked with Super-8 film and video, later Woloshen specialized in 16mm independent film techniques at Concordia University in Montreal. He initially made documentaries and collage films, but the freedom and accessibility of scratch animation won him over. He has since created animated and experimental films, which have been shown at screenings and festivals around the world.

Working in camera-less animation since 1982, Woloshen has used scratches and lacerations on film to create emotional content.

Since Woloshen's return to filmmaking in 1996, after a hiatus of more than a decade spent working in various capacities in the film industry, Woloshen has been busy, seemingly increasing his output year by year even as he faces the usual obstacles that tend to slow an independent filmmaker’s career (parenthood, the need to earn a living, lack of financing). The years Woloshen spent working on film sets and in labs were far from wasted: Woloshen’s work “post-hiatus” is assured compared to his promising films from the 80s, showing progress in aesthetics, graphic technique and understanding of lab processes.

Since 1999 Woloshen has worked exclusively in 35mm CinemaScope, an oddity in the independent film world that is made possible by his otherwise thrifty means of production. His works have screened worldwide at festivals including the Montreal World Film Festival, Tampere International Short Film Festival, Annecy International Animated Film Festival, Ottawa International Animation Festival, and I Castelli Animati in Rome.

Woloshen was recently the subject of a retrospective screening at Saw Video Gallery, hosted by the Canadian Film Institute He is also featured in a new anthology on animation, The Sharpest Point: Animation at the End of Cinema, edited by Chris Gehman and Steve Reinke and co-published by YYZ Books, the Ottawa International Animation Festival and the Images Film and Video Festival.

His film, Cameras Take Five, was included in the Animation Show of Shows.

Work
Woloshen is heavily inspired by music, particularly jazz, and has made numerous short abstract works in which the images are created in synchronization to a music track.  While most of his films are exuberantly colored, Me Me Ma Ma (2000) is done in spare black and white. White scratches resembling rubbings, chalk drawings or electronic static jitter across a black background, matched to the driving beat of a techno music piece. Bru Ha Ha! (2002) takes a piece by Erik Satie and translates it into abstract imagery. The deep, masculine sound of a tuba appears in blocky shapes of colour, contrasted with delicate white squiggles corresponding to a woman singing. The tuba and voice play off each other as if in conversation, male and female. Dave Brubeck’s jazz classic “Take Five” is the inspiration for Cameras Take Five (2002), in which fluid lines represent the saxophone voice, moving over top of color fields of electric blue and green interspersed with playful shapes and doodles. These are vibrant, light-hearted works, which capture the spirit and energy of the music.

As in jazz, improvisation and chance are important aspects of Woloshen’s work. Because his films are self-funded and the tools of his craft (film leader, markers, inks, brushes and craft knives) are readily available, he can seize on an inspiration and act on it immediately. He writes: “I think spontaneous urges and desires are the best part of handmade film making.” Woloshen even constructed a portable scratch box so that he could do scratch animation during breaks on his job as a driver in the feature film industry.

As fun as Woloshen’s musical salutes are, for me the strongest and most satisfying of his films are those which depart somewhat from this method, such as The Babble on Palms (2001) and Two Eastern Hair Lines (2004). The Babble on Palms features various found-footage scenes of everyday life, accompanied by music by Ali Akbar Khan. The outline of a hand appears over all of the scenes, partially blocking our view. The hand is treated with constantly changing decoration such as dots and spirals, and patterns and colours reminiscent of both the solar system and cells under a microscope – the universe is contained in our hand. The film suggests a thread connecting all people, but also the limitations of our viewpoint and the individuality (the “hand print”) that sets us apart.

Two Eastern Hair Lines also employs found footage, and is composed primarily of scenes of two or three people – a man and woman in a room together, two men seated across a desk from one another, a couple seated side-by-side. Parts of the images are framed, blocked out, or painted over, dividing and isolating the figures from each other. Set against a 1939 Chinese recording, “Parting at Yang Kwan,” Two Eastern Hair Lines is full of longing. It reflects on the unbridgeable distance between people and the difficulties of communication. As Woloshen writes in his description, “Sometimes the rifts between us are as wide as rivers, and sometimes as small as hair lines.”

He has been a five-time Jutra/Iris award nominee for Best Animated Short Film, receiving nods at the 6th Jutra Awards in 2004 for Two Eastern Hair Lines, the 8th Jutra Awards in 2006 for The Curse of the Voodoo Child, the 12th Jutra Awards in 2010 for Playtime, the 19th Quebec Cinema Awards in 2019 for Casino, and the 22nd Quebec Cinema Awards in 2020 for Organic.

Writing

2010 "Recipes for Reconstruction" Scratchatopia Books. Montreal 

2015 "Scratch, Crackle & Pop" Scratchatopia Books. Montreal

Filmography
Son of Dada 1982. 16mm. sound.
Didre Novo 1983. 16mm sound.
Pepper Steak 1984. 16mm. sound.
Get Happy 1999. 35mm. sound. CinemaScope
MeMeMaMa 2000. 35mm. sound.
Ditty Dot Comma 2001. 35mm. sound. CinemaScope
Bru Ha Ha! 2002 35mm . sound
Cameras Take Five 2003. 35mm. sound. Featured music by Dave Brubeck. CinemaScope
The Babble on Palms 2002 35mm . sound
SNIP 2004. 35mm. sound. Featured music by Fats Waller. CinemaScope
Minuet 2003 35mm . sound
Two Eastern Hair Lines 2002 35mm . sound
Rebuttal 2005 35mm . sound
The Curse of The Voodoo Child 2005. 35mm. sound . CinemaScope
Changing Evan 2003. 35mm. sound. Featured music by Count Basie. CinemaScope
Phont Cycle 2006 35mm . sound
Shimmer Box Drive 2007. 35mm. sound. Featured music by Buddy Rich. CinemaScope
RH Factor 2008 35mm . sound
Chronicle Reconstructions 2008 35mm . sound
Zero Visibility 2008 35mm . sound
Scrapbook 2008 35mm . silent
The Homestead Act 2009 35mm . sound
Fleeing Rotland 2009 35mm . sound
Vista 2008 35mm . silent in VistaVision
Playtime 2009. 35mm. sound . Featured music by Oscar Peterson. CinemaScope. Tribute to the paintings of Canadian Painters Eleven esp. Jock Macdonald.
The Rosetta Stone 2010 35mm . sound
2010 Melbourne International Animation Festival Trailer 2010 35mm . sound
Fiesta Brava 2011 35mm . sound
Visual Music for Ten Voices 2011 35mm . silent
When the Sun Turns into Juice 2011 35mm . sound
Free Jafar 2012 35mm . sound
Frobisher Bay 2013 35mm . sound
National tapestry 2012 35mm . silent
1000 Plateaus (2004 - 2014) 2014 35mm . sound
Implosion 2016 35mm . sound
Casino 2016 35mm . sound
National Tapestry 2017
This shadow, over each departure 2018
The Dead Sea Scrolls 2018
Objects Within 2018
Father Knows Father Best 2018
Uprising 2019
Organic 2019

References

External links

Living people
1960 births
Artists from Montreal
Film directors from Montreal
Anglophone Quebec people
Concordia University alumni
Canadian animated film directors
Canadian experimental filmmakers
Visual music artists
Drawn-on-film animators